Lars Johan Wictor Gyllensten (12 November 1921 – 25 May 2006) was a Swedish author and physician, and a member of the Swedish Academy.

Gyllensten was born and grew up in a middle-class family in Stockholm, son of Carl Gyllensten and Ingrid Rangström, and nephew of Ture Rangström. He studied at the Karolinska Institute, becoming a doctor of medicine in 1953, and was an associate professor of histology there from 1955 to 1973.

His first written work, published under the pseudonym Jan Wictor in 1946, was a collection of poetry by Gyllensten and Torgny Greitz entitled Camera Obscura, a straight-faced parody of Swedish modernist 1940s poetry. His last work was published in 2004. He left the Karolinska Institute to become a full-time author in 1973. He has been described as a Swedish counterpart to Thomas Mann and Albert Camus. Few of his works have been translated into English, French and German.

He became a member of the Swedish Academy in 1966, was permanent secretary of the Academy from 1977 to 1986, served on the Swedish Academy's Nobel Prize committee from 1968 to 1987, became a member of the Nobel Foundation in 1979 (serving as chairman from 1987 to 1993), and was an honorary member of the Royal Swedish Academy of Letters, History and Antiquities.

Gyllensten left the Swedish Academy in 1989 as a result of its failure to support Salman Rushdie following the fatwa calling for Rushdie's death because of his controversial novel The Satanic Verses. According to the rules of the Academy, Gyllensten remained a passive member for the remainder of his life.

Notes

External links
Obituary, The Times, 17 June 2006

1921 births
2006 deaths
Writers from Stockholm
Swedish pathologists
Swedish-language writers
Members of the Swedish Academy
Karolinska Institute alumni
Selma Lagerlöf Prize winners
Dobloug Prize winners

Burials at Norra begravningsplatsen
Members of the Royal Swedish Academy of Sciences